Dolven is a surname. Notable people with the surname include:

A. K. Dolven (born 1953), Norwegian artist
Arnt Dolven (1892–1954), Norwegian agronomist and politician
Jeff Dolven, American academic and poet